Kankakee Valley High School is a public secondary school serving grades 9–12 in Wheatfield Township, Indiana. It is the only high school in the Kankakee Valley School Corporation.

About
Kankakee Valley High School is a part of the Kankakee Valley School Corporation and is located in northern Jasper County Indiana. The school does not represent one single town or city, but rather incorporates students primarily from the surrounding communities of Demotte and Wheatfield.

See also

 List of high schools in Indiana

References

Sources
District Website
School Website

Public high schools in Indiana
Schools in Jasper County, Indiana
1971 establishments in Indiana
Educational institutions established in 1971